The Irish state has officially approved the following List of National Monuments in County Kildare.  In the Republic of Ireland, a structure or site may be deemed to be a "National Monument", and therefore worthy of state protection, if it is of national importance.  If the land adjoining the monument is essential to protect it, this land may also be protected.

National Monuments 

 
|}

Sources 
 National Monuments in County Kildare

Kildare
National monuments